Liotina solidula is a species of small sea snail, a marine gastropod mollusk, in the family Liotiidae.

Description
The height of the shell attains 9 mm.

Distribution
This species occurs in the Western Pacific.

References

 Higo, S., Callomon, P. & Goto, Y. (1999). Catalogue and bibliography of the marine shell-bearing Mollusca of Japan. Osaka. : Elle Scientific Publications. 749 pp.

External links
 To World Register of Marine Species
 

solidula
Gastropods described in 1859